Kouassi-Kouassikro Department is a department of N'Zi Region in Lacs District, Ivory Coast. In 2021, its population was 30,962 and its seat is the settlement of Kouassi-Kouassikro. The sub-prefectures of the department are  Kouassi-Kouassikro and Mékro.

History
Kouassi-Kouassikro Department was created in 2012 by dividing Bocanda Department.

Notes

Departments of N'Zi Region
States and territories established in 2012
2012 establishments in Ivory Coast